Sampath is a given name and surname, meaning prosperity or wealth in Hindu/Sanskrit.

Given name 
 K. V. Sampath Kumar (1956/1957–2021), Indian newspaper editor
 P. Sampath Kumar, Indian politician
 R. Sampath Raj (born 1969), Indian politician
 Sampath Amaratunge (born 1964), Sri Lankan academic and administrator
 Sampath Kumar (1950–2009), Indian actor known by his stage name Vishnuvardhan
 Sampath Kumar D.Y. (1927–1999), Indian dancer and choreographer
 Sampath Kuttymani (born 1986), Indian footballer
 Sampath Lakmal de Silva (–2006), Sri Lankan journalist
 Sampath Nandi (born 1980), Indian film director
 Sampath Parthasarathy 
 Sampath Perera  (born 1965), Sri Lankan football manager
 Sampath Perera (cricketer) (born 1982), Sri Lankan cricketer
 Sampath Raj (born 1968), Indian actor
 Sampath Ram, Indian actor
 Sampath Tennakoon (1959 –2021), Sri Lankan actor

Surname 
A. G. Sampath, Indian politician
Anirudhan Sampath (born 1962), Indian politician
Balaji Sampath (born 1973), Indian educationist and social activist
Chaminda Sampath, Sri Lankan politician
Chiki Sampath (1920–1990), Trinidadian cricketer
E. V. K. Sampath (–1977), Indian politician
Janaka Sampath (born 1987), Sri Lankan cricketer
Jai Sampath (born 1984), Indian actor
Kuppuswami Sampath, Indian footballer
M. C. Sampath, Indian politician
Nanjil Sampath, Indian politician
Nuwan Sampath (born 1996), Sri Lankan cricketer
Ram Sampath (born 1977), Indian musical artist
Roland Sampath (born 1957), Trinidadian cricketer
Shanaka Sampath (born 1991), Sri Lankan cricketer
Srinivasan Sampath (born 1961), Indian electrochemist, nanotechnologist and professor
Suranga Sampath, Sri Lankan blind cricketer
Thusara Sampath (born 1974), Sri Lankan cricketer
Tillakaratne Sampath (born 1982), Sri Lankan cricketer
V. S. Sampath (born 1950), 18th Chief Election Commissioner of India
Vikram Sampath, Indian historian

See also 
 Mavinakere Cheluvayyangar (1904–1983), Indian film actor better known by his stage name Sampath